Death education is education about death that focuses on the human and emotional aspects of death. Though it may include teaching on the biological aspects of death, teaching about coping with grief is a primary focus. The scientific study of death is known as thanatology. Thanatology stems from the Greek word thanatos, meaning death, and ology meaning a science or organized body of knowledge.  A specialist in this field is a thanatologist. 

Death education refers to the experiences and activities of death that one deals with. Death education also deals with being able to grasp the different processes of dying, talk about the main topics of attitudes and meanings toward death, and the after effects on how to learn to care for people who are affected by the death. The main focus in death education is teaching people how to cope with grief. Many people feel death education is taboo and instead of talking about death and grieving, they hide it away and never bring it up with others. With the right education about death, the less taboo it may become.

History
Historically death education in American society has been seen as a taboo topic, not worthy of scholarly research or for educational purposes. In the 1960s pioneering professionals like that of Herman Feifel (1959), Elisabeth Kübler-Ross (1969), and Cicely Saunders (1967) encouraged behavioral scientists, clinicians, and humanists to pay attention and to study death-related topics. This initiated the death-awareness movement and began the widespread study of death-related behavior, developing new programs of care for the dying and bereaved, as well as new research on death-related attitudes.

Goals
"Death is no enemy of life; it restores our sense of the value of living. Illness restores the sense of proportion that is lost when we take life for granted. To learn about value and proportion we need to honor illness, and ultimately to honor death." Death education honors death by educating about death, dying, and bereavement to enrich personal lives, inform and guide individuals in their transactions with society, prepare individuals for their public roles as citizens, help prepare and support individuals in their professional and vocational roles, and lastly to enhance the ability of individuals to communicate effectively about death-related matters.

Hospice
One of the major organizations that educates people on death is Hospice. Hospice offers support for the caregiver, and Hospice also offers information on what to expect before death and what the family can expect after death. One of the major subjects that hospice addresses within death are the myths that come along with death. Hospice will also walk caretakers through the signs and symptoms to look for that signify death.
Hospice is an important type of care that helps spread and explain death education to the people. When people have a loved one that is not able to get anymore help from medication or doctors, it would be a good recommendation for them to go to hospice. They would be able to receive great support and comfort during the end of their life journey. Not only does hospice give care to the terminally ill, they also give grief suggestions to family members and close friends. "With proper care, proper support, and love, we can share the miracle that is life".  The end of a person's life should be centered on being alive instead of being dead.

Curriculum
Students of a death education course need to clearly understand the complex knowledge of the subject, learn the five key areas of knowledge, and to learn the physical, psycho-social, behavioral, and cognitive aspects of death. The five key areas are: understanding the dying process, decision making for end of life, loss, grief, and bereavement, assessment and intervention, and traumatic death. Death education should be taught in perspective and one's emotional response should be proportionate to the occasion. In addition death education can be taught formally or informally. Formally planned death education is associated with learning in organized educational settings including: schools, colleges, graduate education, professional workshops, and volunteer training programs.

Stages of dying
In her book, On Death and Dying (1969), Elisabeth Kubler-Ross proposed the five stages of the dying process. Though her work has often been referred to as the "five stages of grief," the original work was based on her clinical observations of the psychosocial responses of terminally ill patients to their impending death. Much scholarly debate has surrounded the legitimacy of her five "stages"—denial, anger, bargaining, depression, and acceptance. Experienced psychosocial clinicians have largely rejected the accuracy of the model because it addresses only emotional states, sets up false expectations of the process, and have not been empirically verified as a descriptive model.

The first stage is denial and isolation. When you first hear about a loved one who has a deathly illness your first instinct is to deny the reality of the situation.  This is known as a defense mechanism because we block out the words by not fully processing them and also hide from the facts.
The second stage is anger. Once the blocking out subsides the reality of the situation becomes overwhelming and the pain from the news emerges.
The third stage is bargaining. This stage you will feel more vulnerable and helpless. In order to gain control again you'll start thinking of ways that would have made it better like:
•	"If only we had sought medical attention sooner…"
•	"If only we got a second opinion from another doctor…"
•	"If only we had tried to be a better person toward them…"

All of these are defense lines to try and protect us from the reality of pain in a lost one.
The fourth stage is depression. In this stage there can be two different types of depression that you deal with. The first type of depression can be a more quiet and private feeling. The second type of depression is the kind where sadness and regret overtake your body and become the predominant factors in your life.
The fifth and final stage is acceptance. This stage does not always reach everyone but for the people who actually get it should consider this stage as a gift. It does not mean that you will not be sad anymore but it does mean that there is going to be some kind of peace that you are able to reach with the loved one that died.

Summary
Even though people are still conservative towards the idea of death and dying, with help and the education of death, people will come to know death as a natural part of life that everyone will someday have to go through. Instead of being timid and scared of death, people will become comfortable towards the topic and be able to prepare for what will come in the future. Death education is not just for medical professionals and those dealing with the terminally ill but rather death education is beneficial to everyone for it reveals the importance of quality in living and the human search for meaning. "Dying was what human life moved toward and therefore dying was what a human being constantly prepared for."

References

Citations

Works cited
 Corr, C. A.; Corr, D. M. (2013). Death & Dying Life & Living. Wadsworth publishing. 7th edition, 5–14.
 Frank, A. W. (1995). At the Will of the Body: Reflections on illness (new afterword). Boston: Houghton Mifflin. p. 120.
 Moran, G. (2003). "Introduction: Does Anyone Need Death Education?" (PDF).

Death